The Ho Chi Minh City University of Economics and Finance (UEF) is a Vietnamese private university based in Ho Chi Minh City, Vietnam.
Its main branch is located at: Dien Bien Phu, District Binh Thanh, Ho Chi Minh City.

Facilities

Ho Chi Minh City University of Economics and Finance is located near the center of town (5 minutes drive to the Central Business District). It has modern equipment in a tower of 16 floors and 2 basement floors. 

 Classrooms fully equipped with air-conditioning, computers, projectors and Wifi
 Information Technology classrooms with individual desktops for each student 
 A library with all the books the students need for their studies
 A Self-studying and social area for students to relax in their free time
 A fitness center with coach Ly Duc (2002 Asian Games Bodybuilding Champion)

Academic programs

The curricula provided at the UEF are relevant to modern day business life. The teaching methods focus on student interaction, teamwork, discussions and presentations. Other than that, students are brought to cultivate problem solving and creative thinking skills.  And to be sure all the students acquire the skills taught, the classes are designed to accommodate no more than 30 students.

Business Administration
 General Management
 Small and Medium-sized Enterprises Management
 Entrepreneurship
 Logistics Management

International Business
 International Management
 Foreign Trade

Marketing
 Marketing Management
 Branding
 Advertising

Business Law
 International Commerce Law
 Business Law
 Law of Finance and Banking

E-Commerce
 Online business
 Online Marketing

Finance and Banking
 Banking
 Business Finance
 Public Finance
 Investment Finance

Accounting
 Accounting
 Business Accounting

Information Technology
 IT Security
 Web technologies
 Software
 Networking

English
 Business English
 English Translation
 Academic English

Public Relations
 Event Management and Coordination
 News Media

Hospitality Management
 Hospitality Management
 Hospitality and Tourism Management
 Hospitality and Restaurant Management

Human Resource Management

International exchange programs

The Ho Chi Minh City University of Economics and Finance has partnerships with the University of Pittsburgh (USA) and the University of Bangkok (Thailand).

Internships and employment for students

Alongside with the Academic process, the UEF keeps strong ties with the business world. In that matter, students are offered internship and professional opportunities at UEF's partner companies in sectors such as banking (Sacombank, HSBC, Vietcombank, ANZ), retail (Nguyen Kim, AEON) or corporate services (KPMG).

References

External links
 Official Vietnamese website
 Official English website
 Institute of International Education

Private universities and colleges
Universities in Ho Chi Minh City